Sinki may refer to:

 Sinki, Gmina Bądkowo, a village in North-central Poland.
 Sinki, Gmina Zakrzewo, a village in North-central Poland.
 Sinki (food), a Nepalese dish.